"L'Orange" is a 1964 song recorded by French singer and songwriter Gilbert Bécaud. It was covered in 2003 by the contestants of the French third version of the TV reality show Star Academy, and achieved a great success in France and Belgium (Wallonia), where it topped the chart for several weeks. As of August 2014, the song was the 20th best-selling single of the 21st century in France, with 560,000 units sold. In January 2004, thanks to the cover version, the original one by Gilbert Bécaud was charted for five weeks on the French Singles Chart, but peaked only at #89.

The B-side of the CD single is "Wot!", a cover version of Captain Sensible's 1980s hit.

In the video, the participants of the Star Academy 3 perform the song in a market, and Michal, the finalist, is accused of having robbed an orange.

Track listing
 CD single
 "L'Orange" — 2:51
 "Wot" — 3:07

Charts

References

1964 songs
2003 singles
Ultratop 50 Singles (Wallonia) number-one singles
SNEP Top Singles number-one singles
Star Academy France songs
Songs with music by Gilbert Bécaud
Songs written by Pierre Delanoë